Francesc Ramirez (born 7 September 1976) is an Andorran footballer. He has played for the Andorra national team and Santa Coloma.

Honours
CE Principat
Primera Divisió: 1997–98
Copa Constitució: 1998

UE Sant Julià
Primera Divisió: 2004–05

FC Rànger's
Primera Divisió: 2005–06, 2006–07

FC Santa Coloma
Primera Divisió: 2010–11, 2013–14
Copa Constitució: 2012

International statistics
Updated 28 September 2014

References

External links

1976 births
Living people
Andorran footballers
FC Santa Coloma players
Association football defenders
Andorra international footballers
CE Principat players